Mount Bess is located on the border of Alberta and British Columbia. It is the 83rd highest peak in Alberta. It was named in 1910 by J. Norman Collie after Bessie Gunn, who accompanied Collie's expedition.

See also
List of peaks on the Alberta–British Columbia border

References

Three-thousanders of Alberta
Three-thousanders of British Columbia
Canadian Rockies